Cranberry Lake is a lake in the city of Kawartha Lakes, Ontario, Canada.

See also
List of lakes in Ontario

References
 National Resources Canada

Lakes of Kawartha Lakes